Roman Muzyk (28 February 1938 – 24 September 2003) was a Polish hurdler. He competed in the men's 110 metres hurdles at the 1960 Summer Olympics.

References

1938 births
2003 deaths
Athletes (track and field) at the 1960 Summer Olympics
Polish male hurdlers
Olympic athletes of Poland
Place of birth missing
20th-century Polish people